Anyuan County is a rural county in the prefecture-level city of Ganzhou, Jiangxi.

Administrative divisions
In the present, Anyuan County has 8 towns and 10 townships.

8 Towns:

10 Townships:

Climate

References

Ganzhou
County-level divisions of Jiangxi